The Dangote Refinery is an oil refinery owned by  Aliko Dangote  that will be inaugurated before the end of the first quarter of 2023 in Lekki, Nigeria. When in full operation, it is expected to  have the capacity to process about 650,000 barrels per day of crude oil, making it the largest single-train refinery in the world. The investment is over 25 billion US dollars.

History

Nigerian businessman Aliko Dangote unveiled early plans for the refinery in September 2013, when he announced that he had secured about $3.3 billion in financing for the project.  At the time, the refinery was estimated to cost about $9 billion, of which $3 billion would be invested by the Dangote Group and the remainder via commercial loans, and begin production in 2016.  However, after a change in location to Lekki, construction of the refinery did not begin until 2016 with excavation and infrastructure preparation, and the planned completion was pushed back to late 2018.

In July 2017, major structural construction began, and Dangote estimated that the refinery would be mechanically complete in late 2019 and commissioned in early 2020. According to Reuters, citing sources familiar with the project, construction was likely to take at least twice as long as Dangote publicly stated, with partial refining capability not likely to be achieved until 2022.  An associated project at the site of the refinery, a urea fertilizer factory, was scheduled to begin operation in late 2018 and produce about three million tons of urea annually. In 2018 the project was expected to cost up to $15 billion in total, with $10 billion invested in the refinery, $2.5 billion in the fertilizer factory, and $2.5 billion in pipeline infrastructure.

In July 2022, Dangote - Nigeria's richest resident - had to borrow 187 billion naira (about 442 million USD) at 12.75% resp. 13.5% p.a. to complete the refinery. Fitch Ratings noted that the refinery's start date has been postponed three times in four years and feared diminished investor confidence if operations do not begin in 2023.  At the same time, all of the four refineries of the state-owned oil company NNPC (in Kaduna, Port Harcourt and Warri) are idle and expect to process crude oil again in 2023 after "revamping".

In January 2023, the completion of the refinery's power plant was announced. The inauguration is expected to take place at the end of the first quarter of 2023.

Facility
The refinery is situated on a  site at the Lekki Free Trade Zone, Lekki, Lagos State. It is supplied with crude oil by the largest sub-sea pipeline infrastructure of the world (1,100 km long). When fully operational it will provide 135,000 permanent jobs in the region.

High complexity 
The Dangote Oil Refinery will have a Nelson complexity index of 10.5 which means that it will be more complex than most refineries in the United States (average 9.5) or Europe (average 6.5). (The largest refinery of the world, the Jamnagar Refinery in India, has a complexity of 21.1.) The Nelson complexity index basically increases with the number and capacity of chemical procedures after the distillation, e.g. hydrocracking, NHT, CCR, RFCC, polymerization etc.

Among others, the refinery will run these refinery processes (please find an illustration of the chemical processes in the gallery below):

Superlatives 
In 2019, the world's largest crude distillation column, weighing 2,350 tonnes, was installed in place at the Dangote refinery by a specialist Dutch company. With a height of 112 metres it is slightly taller than the Saturn V rocket which brought the first man to the moon (110.6m) and 16 metres taller than Big Ben.
In the same year, three more records were set when the world's heaviest refinery regenerator was installed - having already been the "heaviest item ever to be transported over a public road in Africa" at a stately 3,000 tonnes and also being "the heaviest single piece of steel structure" of the world. As a part of the RFCC (Residue Fluid Catalytic Cracker) a regenerator boils heavy crude oil components until their molecules break up and turn into lighter molecular components like gasoline, kerosene etc. This improves the efficiency of turning crude oil into more valuable components.

The de-butanizer of the unsaturated gas plant is 50 metres high, has a diameter of 8 meters and weighs 520 tons. An unsaturated gas plant handles streams from cracking units that contain unsaturated olefins such as butylene and propylene. The gas plant consists usually of a de-ethanizer, a sponge absorber, a de-butanizer, a de-propanizer and a de-isobutanizer.

The Penex stabilizer column is 50 metres high, has a diameter of 8 metres and weighs 520 tons. In the Penex process the molecules of light straight run naphtha are "isomerized" (rearranged) into molecules of a higher octane level by using a catalyst like aluminium chloride.

Marine facilities 
The self sufficient marine facility has the ability for freight optimization. To the marine facilities belong:

 2 crude SPM (single point mooring, see image below) for unloading ships from Aframax to ULCC (ultra-large crude carrier)
 3 product SPM for product exports up to Suezmax vessels
 2 subsea crude pipelines (diameter 48" or 1.22 metres) with interconnection
 4 subsea pipelines for products and imports (diameter 24" or 0.61 metres)
 ca. 120km subsea pipeline

Targeted performance 
With a single crude oil distillation unit, the refinery will be the largest single-train refinery in the world.

At full production, the facility will process about 650,000 barrels of crude oil daily, transported via pipelines from oil fields in the Niger Delta, where natural gas will also be sourced to supply the fertilizer factory and be used in electrical generation for the refinery complex. With a greater capacity than the total output of Nigeria's existing refining infrastructure, the Dangote Refinery will be able to meet the country's entire domestic fuel demand, as well as export refined products.

Gallery

References

Oil refineries in Nigeria
Proposed energy infrastructure in Africa
Buildings and structures in Lagos State
Economy of Lagos State
Lekki
Buildings and structures under construction in Nigeria